This is a list of rivers in the state of North Dakota in the United States.

Alphabetically
Bois de Sioux River
Cannonball River
Cedar Creek
Cut Bank Creek
Deep River
Des Lacs River
Elm River (North Dakota), tributary of Red River of the North
Elm River (South Dakota), tributary of James River
Forest River
Goose River
Green River
Heart River
James River
Knife River
Little Goose River
Little Heart River
Little Knife River, tributary of Knife River
Little Knife River, tributary of Missouri River
Little Missouri River
Little Muddy Creek
Little Muddy River
Long Creek
Maple River (North Dakota), tributary of Sheyenne River
Maple River (South Dakota), tributary of Elm River of South Dakota
Missouri River
North Fork Grand River
Park River
Pembina River
Pipestem River
Red River of the North
Rush River
Sheyenne River
Souris River
Spring Creek
Tobacco Garden Creek
Tongue River
Turtle River
White Earth River
Wild Rice River
Wintering River
Yellowstone River

By tributary

Missouri River
Little Muddy Creek (mouth in Montana)
Yellowstone River
Little Muddy River
Tobacco Garden Creek
White Earth River
Little Knife River
Little Missouri River
Knife River
Little Knife River
Spring Creek
Heart River
Green River
Little Heart River
Cannonball River
Cedar Creek
North Fork Grand River
James River
New Rockford Canal
Pipestem Creek
Elm River
Maple River

Red River of the North
Bois de Sioux River
Wild Rice River
Sheyenne River
Maple River
Rush River
New Rockford Canal
Elm River
Goose River
Little Goose River
Turtle River
Forest River
Park River
Pembina River
Tongue River

Souris River
Antler Creek
Des Lacs River
Wintering River
Deep River
Cut Bank Creek
Long Creek

See also

List of longest streams of Minnesota
List of rivers in the United States

North Dakota
 
Rivers